Karen Andrew (born 14 April 1976) is a former English female rugby union player. She represented  at the 2006 Women's Rugby World Cup. She played in the final against the Black Ferns in the 2006 World Cup, she kicked a penalty and a conversion but couldn't help her side win.

References

1976 births
Living people
England women's international rugby union players
English female rugby union players